Serial Girlfriend is the sixth solo album by former Headcoatee Holly Golightly. It features a prominent garage sound and is composed of twelve original songs and one cover song.

Track listing
All tracks written by Holly Golightly unless otherwise noted.
"I Can't Be Trusted" – 2:43
"You Shine" – 2:22
"Want No Other" (M. Delanian, Holly Golightly) – 2:56 
"Your Love Is Mine" (Ike Turner) – 4:40 
"Grandstand" – 2:03
"Clean in Two" – 3:08
"Down, Down, Down" – 2:28
"Come the Day" – 2:43
"Serial Girlfriend" – 2:12
"My Own Sake" – 2:15
"Where Can I Go" – 2:23
"'Til I Get" – 3:57
"Now" – 4:48

Personnel

Holly Golightly – double bass, guitar, piano, vocals
Dan Melchior – guitar, harmonica, vocals
Bruce Brand – drums, guitar, percussion, piano
Ed Deegan – guitar
Rick Appleby – electric bass
Woodie Taylor – drums, percussion
Matt Radford – double bass
Brian Nevill – drums, piano
George Sueref – guitar
Michael Delanian – piano
John Gibbs – electric bass

References

1998 albums
Holly Golightly (singer) albums